Justad is a surname. Notable people with the surname include:

Annette Malm Justad (born 1958), Norwegian businesswoman
Sondre Justad (born 1990), Norwegian musician and songwriter

Norwegian-language surnames